Hensuki, short for Hensuki: Are You Willing to Fall in Love with a Pervert, as Long as She's a Cutie? is a Japanese romantic comedy light novel series written by Tomo Hanama and illustrated by sune. The series follows Keiki Kiryū, a high school student who seeks the identity of the sender of an unnamed love letter attached to an underwear, which consequently leads him to discover the special hidden peculiarities of the girls in his life. Media Factory published fourteen volumes of the series under their MF Bunko J imprint from January 25, 2017 to January 25, 2022.

A manga series adaptation illustrated by CHuN was serialized in Fujimi Shobo's Monthly Dragon Age magazine from November 9, 2017, to December 9, 2020. Six tankōbon volumes have been released. A spin-off manga titled Hensuki: Are You Willing to Fall in Love with a Pervert, as Long as She's a Cutie? Abnormal Harem was illustrated by kanbe and Hanamoto. Hakusensha published its first and only volume on April 24, 2020 under their Young Animal Comics imprint.


Volume list

Light novel

Manga 
Hensuki: Are You Willing to Fall in Love with a Pervert, as Long as She's a Cutie?

Hensuki: Are You Willing to Fall in Love with a Pervert, as Long as She's a Cutie? Abnormal Harem

See also 
List of Hensuki episodes

References

External links 
Official website 

Hensuki
Hensuki